Ravil Velimukhamedovich Aryapov (born February 1, 1948, in Stavropol, now Tolyatti) is a Russian professional football coach and a former player. As of July 2009, he is an assistant coach with the reserve team of FC Krylia Sovetov Samara.

Honours
 Top scorer in FC Krylia Sovetov Samara history: 105 goals.

External links
 Career summary at KLISF

1948 births
Living people
Soviet footballers
Russian footballers
Soviet Top League players
PFC Krylia Sovetov Samara players
Russian football managers
Association football forwards
Sportspeople from Tolyatti